The 2003 POMIS Cup was the 16th championship of an international soccer club tournament held in Maldives.  The group stage started on 14 October 2003 and the final was played on 25 October 2003 at the Rasmee Dhandu Stadium, Malé, Maldives.

Teams
The top four teams of 2003 Dhivehi League and two invited foreign clubs.

Teams and nation
Note: Table lists clubs in alphabetical order.

Group stage

Group A

Group B

Semi finals

Final

External links
 RSSSF 2003 POMIS Cup

References

2003
2003 in Asian football
2003 in Maldivian football
2003–04 in Indian football
2003 in Sri Lankan sport